Błażkowa may refer to the following places in Poland:
Błażkowa, Lower Silesian Voivodeship (south-west Poland)
Błażkowa, Subcarpathian Voivodeship (south-east Poland)